Bengt Johan Fredrik Nordén (born May 15, 1945 in Lund) is a Swedish chemist.

Biography and academic career

Bengt Nordén graduated 1967 with a Master of Science degree in chemistry, theoretical physics and mathematics from Lund University and was awarded his Ph.D. in 1971 from Lund University where he became Associate Professor of Inorganic Chemistry in 1972. In 1979 he was appointed to the Chair Professorship of Physical Chemistry of Chalmers University of Technology.

Nordén's research concerns optical Linear dichroism spectroscopy of macroscopically oriented, mainly bio-macromolecular systems. He has developed novel DNA-binding ligands, such as bis-intercalating compounds and peptide nucleic acids (PNA), and demonstrated DNA-ligand reorganisations between groove-binding and intercalation binding geometries involving extreme activation energies and recognition due to kinetic (in contrast to thermodynamic) selection. His method “Site Specific Linear Dichroism by Molecular Replacement” methodology applied to DNA complexes with RecA and Rad51 recombination proteins has revealed details of the recombination mechanism and is also applied to study structure of membrane proteins in a true membrane environment.

Nordén was councilor for Science and Technology to the Swedish Government in 1991-1994. He was Chairman of the selection committee for the European Science Foundation’s Young Research Investigator Awards 2003-2006; chemistry editor of the Swedish National Encyclopedia, Chairman of the Chemistry Section of the Swedish Research Council 1996-2000. He is currently Chair of the Nanyang Technological University Research Council (Singapore) and Chair of the board of editors of Quarterly Reviews of Biophysics

Nordén is a member of the Royal Swedish Academy of Sciences since 1991 and was member of the Nobel Committee for Chemistry from 1995 to 2004, and the Committee's chairman from 2000 to 2003 and the Academy's Chemistry Section chairman 2004-2009. He is a member of the Royal Swedish Academy of Engineering Sciences, The Royal Physiographic Society in Lund, The Royal Society of Arts and Sciences in Gothenburg (Kungliga Vetenskaps- och Vitterhetssamhället i Göteborg), The National Academy of Sciences of Germany (German Academy of Sciences Leopoldina), the Swedish Academy of Engineering Sciences in Finland, The Norwegian Academy of Science, The Finnish Society of Science and Letters, and The Academy of Sciences for the Developing World (TWAS).

Molecular Frontiers

Nordén is founder of Molecular Frontiers, a global organization with objective to early identify breakthroughs in science and to stimulate young people's interests in science. Molecular Frontiers has in its Advisory Board many very research active Nobel Laureates.

See also
 Official website of Bengt Nordén
  Nordén's lab
 Molecular Frontiers Foundation web site
 MoleClues.org

References

1945 births
Swedish chemists
Living people
Inorganic chemists
Members of the Royal Physiographic Society in Lund
Members of the Royal Society of Sciences and Letters in Gothenburg
Members of the Royal Swedish Academy of Sciences
Members of the Royal Swedish Academy of Engineering Sciences
Members of the German Academy of Sciences Leopoldina
Members of the Norwegian Academy of Science and Letters